Sóndor (possibly from Quechua suntur: congress, meeting) is a mountain in the Cusco Region in Peru, about  high. It is situated in the Calca Province, on the border of the districts of Calca and Lamay. Sóndor lies southeast of a group of lakes. The largest of them is Pampacocha (possibly from Quechua for "plain lake"). South of the mountain there is an intermittent stream named Vilcabamba. It flows to the southwest as a right tributary of the Vilcanota River. The confluence is in Lamay.

References 

Mountains of Peru
Mountains of Cusco Region